James Moffat  is a mathematician. He was a boffin in the 1982 Falklands war. He wrote Complexity Theory and Network Centric Warfare, cited by 275.

Moffat is currently Professor of Physics at the University of Aberdeen, where he studies quantum gravity. He has published 135 articles.  He is a recipient of the Napier Medal in Mathematics and the President’s Medal of the ORS; the 'nobel medal in analytics'. He is also a Fellow of OR, a Fellow of the Institute of Mathematics and its Applications, and a Chartered Mathematician. His contributions to the literature cited 560 times include new theories for Loop Quantum Gravity based on the Mathematics of Operator Algebras.

Moffat was an early writer on the topic of the Agile Organization. Business agility, generally, had been discussed before, but agility, specifically in the context of military organizations, was a new field in 2005.

Selected publications
Complexity Theory and Network Centric Warfare cited by 275
The Agile Organization: From Informal Networks to Complex Effects and Agility cited by 138
Command And Control In The Information Age: Representing Its Impact cited by 60

References

1948 births
Living people
British mathematicians
Academics of the University of Aberdeen